Morris Iemma (born 21 July 1961) is a former Australian politician who was the 40th Premier of New South Wales. He served from 3 August 2005 to 5 September 2008. From Sydney, Iemma attended the University of Sydney and the University of Technology, Sydney. A member of the Labor Party, he was first elected to the Parliament of New South Wales at the 1991 state election, having previously worked as a trade union official. From 1999, Iemma was a minister in the third and fourth ministries led by Bob Carr. He replaced Carr as premier and Leader of the New South Wales Labor Party in 2005, following Carr's resignation. Iemma led Labor to victory at the 2007 state election, albeit with a slightly reduced majority. He resigned as premier in 2008, after losing the support of caucus, and left parliament shortly after, triggering a by-election. He was replaced as premier by Nathan Rees.

Background
Iemma was born in Sydney, the only child of Giuseppe and Maria Iemma, migrants from Martone, Calabria, Italy. Maria Iemma worked in the clothing trade, and Giuseppe Iemma, a communist supporter in Italy, worked as a machine labourer. Morris joined the Labor Party when he was 16. He was educated at state schools in Sydney, including the now-closed Narwee Boys' High School, and has an economics degree from the University of Sydney and a law degree from the University of Technology, Sydney.

In 1997, Iemma married Santina Raiti, with whom he has four children. The couple's eldest child, Clara, is a cricketer.

Iemma is a member of the dominant right-wing faction of the New South Wales branch of the Australian Labor Party. From 1984 to 1986 he was an official with the Commonwealth Bank Employees Union. He then worked as an adviser to Senator Graham Richardson who held the environment and social security portfolios in the Bob Hawke and Paul Keating federal governments.

Iemma is a supporter of the Sydney Swans in the AFL and the St. George Illawarra Dragons in the NRL.

Parliamentary career
In 1991 Iemma was elected to the New South Wales Legislative Assembly for the seat of Hurstville, defeating a sitting Liberal member, with the slogan "A local who listens". When the seat of Hurstville was abolished in 1999, he won a tough pre-selection battle for the safe seat of Lakemba, which included part of the old seat of Hurstville. Iemma held Lakemba until his resignation in 2008.

Iemma was Minister for Public Works and Services and Minister Assisting the Premier on Citizenship (1999-2003), and as Minister for Sport and Recreation (2001-2003), and was Minister for Health (2003-2005). His tenure as Health Minister was generally free of major controversy, although he has said of the Health portfolio: "it is one of the biggest and most difficult jobs in government".

Premier

First ministry

When Bob Carr announced his intention to retire as New South Wales Premier on 3 August 2005, Iemma immediately announced his candidacy to succeed him as leader of the NSW Labor Party and thus as Premier. Police Minister Carl Scully was also a candidate, but on 29 July he withdrew. Iemma was the only candidate when the Labor Caucus met on 2 August to elect a new leader. He was formally appointed by Professor Marie Bashir, the Governor of New South Wales, on 3 August.

Iemma immediately faced a number of resignations. Deputy Premier and Treasurer Andrew Refshauge, and senior minister Craig Knowles, once considered a potential leader himself, both declared they would leave politics. Iemma took the Treasury portfolio for himself. Among his first policy moves as new Premier, Iemma announced the immediate repealing of the vendor tax (a tax on investment property) that was introduced by the Carr government in 2003.

Opinion polls in August showed that Labor under Iemma's leadership was maintaining the lead over the Liberal opposition it had enjoyed under Carr, despite Iemma's relatively low profile. His short-term position was improved by the sudden resignation of Liberal leader John Brogden. This was seen in the results of the by-elections on 17 September caused by the resignation from Parliament of Carr, Refshauge and Knowles. Labor retained all three seats - Maroubra (Carr's seat) very easily, Macquarie Fields (Knowles's seat) comfortably, despite a substantial swing to the Liberals, and Marrickville (Refshauge's seat) despite a strong challenge from the Greens. In Marrickville, where the Labor candidate was Education Minister Carmel Tebbutt (switching from the Legislative Council), the Labor primary vote increased in the absence of a Liberal Party candidate.

Despite its relatively short term in office, the Iemma Government faced significant service delivery problems in transport, health care and future water supplies. Sydney newspapers consistently asserted that Iemma's government was more interested in "spin" than policy development. Other embarrassments beset his premiership. For example, in February 2006, while awaiting the start of a COAG media conference in Canberra, while chatting to Victorian Premier Steve Bracks and not realising cameras were operating, Iemma was recorded as saying:
"Today? This fuckwit who's the new CEO of the Cross City Tunnel has ... been saying what controversy? There is no controversy."
Nevertheless, in the months leading up to his first election as Labor leader, he maintained a comfortable lead in various opinion polls and was re-elected in the March 2007 election. Labor was returned with 52 seats compared to 35 for the Coalition.

Second ministry

On 15 July 2007, after several failures on the NSW rail system, Iemma claimed that the government was at war with rail unions. In November 2007 the Iemma government lifted the ban on genetically modified canola production and started the process of privatising the state's electricity system. On 3 May 2008, the New South Wales ALP's State Conference rejected, by 702 to 107 votes, the Iemma government's plans to privatise the state's electricity system.

Resignation and post-political career

On 5 September 2008, Iemma announced his resignation as Premier after losing the support of his caucus faction over the details of a proposed cabinet reshuffle sparked by the resignation of Deputy Premier John Watkins. Iemma had proposed that five other Ministers also depart, including Treasurer Michael Costa and Health Minister Reba Meagher. Iemma's faction, Centre Unity, supported the sacking of the Treasurer but not the other four Ministers. Faced with this rejection, Iemma resigned. The caucus unanimously selected Nathan Rees as Premier in his stead.

Iemma resigned from parliament on 19 September 2008, ending his 17-year political career, and forcing a by-election in the seat of Lakemba, won by Robert Furolo.

In May 2009, Iemma was admitted to hospital suffering from an acute brain inflammation—viral meningitis. As a result, he lost movement in his legs and underwent physiotherapy with the goal of recovering full use of his legs. Iemma has served as chair of the South Eastern Sydney Local Health District Board since 1 January 2011 and on the boards of the Cancer Institute NSW and the Sydney Cricket & Sports Ground Trust.

In January 2013, there was speculation that Iemma was considering standing for the Division of Barton in the Australian House of Representatives for Labor at the 2013 federal election to replace former Attorney-General Robert McClelland who on that day announced that he would be retiring from parliament after 17 years. Iemma, however, decided not to contest the preselection in Barton, and the preselection instead went to Steve McMahon.

In November 2012 and March 2014 Iemma was called before the NSW Independent Commission Against Corruption (ICAC) in relation to allegations of corrupt behaviour by Eddie Obeid regarding a dispute between Australian Water Holdings and Sydney Water; and in relation to allegations of corrupt behaviour by Ian Macdonald and Obeid regarding the issuing of lucrative mining licences near . Both Obeid and Macdonald were found by ICAC to have acted in a corrupt manner regarding the issuing of mining licences and criminal charges were laid.

Honours
The Morris Iemma Indoor Sports Centre, named in honour of Iemma and operated by the City of Canterbury-Bankstown in partnership with the YMCA NSW, is a modern sports facility that caters for a variety of indoor sports, including netball, basketball, soccer and volleyball as well as incorporating a gym, change rooms, cafeteria and childcare services. The facility was opened in March 2011.

References

External links
 Profile of Morris Iemma from The Sydney Morning Herald
 

Premiers of New South Wales
Members of the New South Wales Legislative Assembly
Australian people of Calabrian descent
Australian politicians of Italian descent
Australian trade unionists
Politicians from Sydney
University of Sydney alumni
University of Technology Sydney Law School alumni
1961 births
Living people
Treasurers of New South Wales
Australian Labor Party members of the Parliament of New South Wales
Labor Right politicians
21st-century Australian politicians